Der Musikladen was a West German music television programme that ran from 13 December 1972 to 29 November 1984. The show continued the 1960s Beat-Club under a new name, and in turn was replaced by Extratour.

History

Around 90 episodes were aired, plus 59 as Musikladen extra with most being made in the period between 1974 and 1979. All episodes were produced by Radio Bremen and directed by Michael Leckebusch.

A normal episode of Musikladen usually featured several live performances by guest musicians, and ran around 45 minutes. Some episodes were longer, and a few were shorter. In the 1980s, music videos were shown along with live performances. The show's famous theme was "A Touch of Velvet – A Sting of Brass" by Mood Mosaic, which had also been used on Beat-Club.

Manfred Sexauer hosted the show with various others. From 12 December 1972 to 21 September 1978, Uschi Nerke, the veteran from Beat-Club, moderated the show with Sexauer. After she left, Sexauer was the lone host till 20 August 1979, when 'Auwa' (August-Walter Thiemann) joined. He left on 15 January 1981, and Sexauer handled the hosting duties alone till 21 June 1984 when he was joined by Christine Röthig. They both moderated the show until its end on 29 November 1984.

Clips from the program can now be seen on VH1 Classic and several DVD compilations have been released. All the episodes air frequently in an edited form, mostly after midnight, from various German TV stations, like NDR, RBB and BFS (BR3). 3Sat also airs Musikladen occasionally.

The Musikladen Go-Go Girls

The Go-Go Girls were two, later three, girls who danced along to various songs on the Musikladen shows.

As part of the revamp of the programme in 1977 (which also saw the introduction of A Touch of Velvet a Sting of Brass by Mood Mosaic as the theme tune), Mike Leckebusch, the director followed the general trend and wanted to serve great music with gorgeous dancing girls.

A casting process was carried out in 1977 in which Monika, Sally and Sylvia were chosen.

Monika was born in 1959 and, while she danced under the name of Monique, her real name is Monika Wulf. She is the voluptuous brunette. In later episodes she is blonde to dark blonde. Monika was a hairdresser and danced in discos in Hamburg. 
Sally, the petite blonde, worked in the Elmshorn tax office until she went to Hamburg and met Monika and Sylvia. They made their first appearance in episode 33 of May 21, 1977. They were officially introduced in episode 35. Sylvia got pregnant and left after a few shows. After that, Monika and Sally continued on their own. 
From episode 47 in December 1979 Angelika was added. Her name is Angelika Heinrich (born in 1960) though she performed as Angelique. She is the one with long dark hair. She was a foreign language correspondent by profession. After her success in the music shop, she turned her dancing hobby into a career.

They continued to appear in discos, but now as star guests and their appearances certainly increased the audience ratings. Towards the end of Musikladen they also recorded some music titles. Angelika once had a record which was later for sale on Ebay. She was also seen in a few performances at various events. Sally had some success in Italy. Monika can be seen in some videos as well as in Udo Lindenberg's Panic Times.

On November 29, 1984 in episode 90 they had their last appearance in Musikladen as reported in an RTL men's magazine. There are said to have also been appearances on Tutti Frutti. Today Sally is the managing director of a Hamburg model agency. Not much is known at present about Monika and Angelika. Angelika was on the NDR talk show in the mid 90s together with Uschi Nerke (Moderator of the musikladen). There she said that she now runs a business (either a restaurant, hotel or stables) with her partner.  Monika trained as an assistant director for a company that dealt with Styling.
Angelika was featured in German Playboy in November 83.
Before that, she apparently also appeared in the act of the otherwise unknown Mike Mareen.

This is an approximate translation of an interview Monika gave to a German Newspaper in 1977.

Monika says :-

Yes, the music shop is fun for me! Especially because the stars respect us. They were curious that Sally, Sylvia and I are not groupies but that we do our job just like them.

Surely a lot of people complain about it "As a go go girl, that's the last thing to say. She's definitely going to get one." Most men see in us the sex object that is easy to get, but that is not the case.

Of course we're called "sex machines" but I'm definitely not one. I appear as a Go Go girl because I think the show industry is great and I make a lot of money dancing. In Musikladen I get up to 900 marks per session.

And besides, dancing at night is a thousand times better than washing hair during the day.

I am a trained hairdresser, but right after the apprenticeship I gave notice and traveled with my friend, who is a disc jockey, and worked as a Go Go girl from disco to disco. I performed every weekend and collected 200 marks.

Then a manager asked me if I wanted to dance with two other girls. For ten performances a month I should get 1000 marks. Honestly I was really keen to perform with Sally and Sylvia.

The three of you feel safer than I did when I was dancing solo.  Sometimes I cried, with all these men just staring at me, which now seems funny.

To prove to you that I have a really hard job, I start my daily routine by getting up at 6 a.m.  

At 7 o'clock in the car from Hamburg to southern Germany.

4 p.m. Start set up of lighting and sound immediately in the disco. 6 p.m. shower in the hotel and eat followed by a

two hour nap.

10 p.m. first performance.

The audience is still a bit reserved.

Midnight, second appearance. The people get into the swing.

3 o'clock last performance. Everyone is tired but in a great mood. Some pushing out of eagerness to see it.

I'm done. A few are asleep on their feet!

The next morning we continue.

Of course, it also happens that men become pushy, so I won't suggest it, but I'll make it clear that I found the boy particularly nice, and I'd like to have his phone number.

Nobody gets my number.

I'm on the road way too much for a boyfriend.

Nevertheless, I still enjoy dancing. By the way, I really enjoy myself with Sally. The two of us now perform together, we design and sew our costumes ourselves and each collects 300-400 marks per evening.

I'm saving my money carefully. I've already saved 7000 marks and either I'll open my own disco with Sally or I'll leave for Jamaica, my dream island!

External links
 Musikladen website Internet Archive
 
 Musikladen channel on YouTube

1972 German television series debuts
1984 German television series endings
Das Erste original programming
German-language television shows
German music television series
Pop music television series
Radio Bremen